Limnodriloidinae is a subfamily of clitellate oligochaete worms.

Species 
The following genera are currently recognized within Limnodriloidinae:
 Doliodrilus Erséus, 1984
 Limnodriloides Pierantoni, 1903
 Parakaketio Erséus, 1982
 Rossidrilus Erséus & Rota, 1996
 Smithsonidrilus Brinkhurst, 1966
 Tectidrilus Erséus, 1982
 Thalassodrilides Brinkhurst & Baker, 1979

References

Further reading 
 Diaz, Robert J., and Christer Erseus. "Habitat preferences and species associations of shallow-water marine Tubificidae (Oligochaeta) from the barrier reef ecosystems off Belize, Central America." Aquatic Oligochaete Biology V. Springer Netherlands, 1994. 93-105.
 Erséus, Christer. "Mangroves and marine oligochaete diversity." Wetlands Ecology and Management 10.3 (2002): 197–202.

Animals described in 1828
Tubificina